Chastity Daniels (born March 21, 1978), known professionally as La Chat, is an American rapper from Memphis, Tennessee. She is best known for her association with the Hypnotize Minds record label. She was one of the two female members of Memphis-based hip hop group Three 6 Mafia alongside Gangsta Boo.

Career
In 2001, La Chat made a guest appearance on the hit Project Pat song Chickenhead, which would go on to receive Gold record status.

La Chat left Hypnotize Minds some time after the release of her debut album, Murder She Spoke (2001).  She went on to release a number of albums and mixtapes for different record labels in the following years.

In 2010, La Chat won Female Rap Artist of the Year at the Knocdown-SCM Awards.

La Chat and Gangsta Boo's collaborative extended play Witch came out on May 27, 2014.

Discography

Studio albums

References

External links
 La Chat on My Space

1978 births
Living people
African-American crunk musicians
American women rappers
African-American women rappers
Gangsta rappers
Prophet Entertainment
Rappers from Memphis, Tennessee
Southern hip hop musicians
21st-century American rappers
21st-century American women musicians
21st-century African-American women
21st-century African-American musicians
20th-century African-American people
20th-century African-American women
21st-century women rappers